Washington Luiz de Paula (23 January 1953 – 15 February 2010), known as Washington, was a Brazilian footballer who played as forward.

Career
Born in Bauru, Washington was a standout youth player who was compared to Pelé after his performance for the Brazilian national youth team in a 1972 tournament in Cannes. His professional career did not match this early success, but he played for the Brazil national Olympic team in 1972, and for a number of professional teams including Corinthians and Guarani.

References

1953 births
2010 deaths
People from Bauru
Associação Ferroviária de Esportes players
Association football forwards
Brazilian footballers
Coritiba Foot Ball Club players
Esporte Clube Bahia players
Esporte Clube Noroeste players
Esporte Clube Vitória players
Goiás Esporte Clube players
Guarani FC players
Sport Club Corinthians Paulista players
Olympic footballers of Brazil
Footballers at the 1972 Summer Olympics
Footballers from São Paulo (state)